Al-Kawthar ("Abundance") is the 108th chapter (sūrah) of the Quran. It is the shortest chapter, consisting of three ayat or verses:

۝ We have given thee abundance 
۝ So pray to your Lord and sacrifice [to Him alone].
۝ Indeed, your enemy is the one cut off.

There are several different opinions as the timing and contextual background of its supposed revelation (asbāb al-nuzūl). According to Ibn Ishaq, it is an earlier "Meccan surah", which is believed to have been revealed in Mecca, sometime before the Isra and Mi'raj.

Text and meaning

Text and transliteration
Hafs from Aasim ibn Abi al-Najud 

¹ 

² 

³ 

Warsh from Nafiʽ al-Madani

¹ 

² 

³

Meanings

Verily, We have granted you (O Muhammad) Al-Kauthar (a river or lake in Paradise);

Therefore turn in prayer to your Lord and sacrifice (to Him only).

For he who makes you angry (O Muhammad), - he will be cut off (from every good thing in this world and in the Hereafter).

Indeed, We have granted you, [O Muhammad], al-Kawthar.

So pray unto thy Lord, and sacrifice.

Indeed, your enemy is the one cut off.

To thee have We granted the Fount (of Abundance).

Therefore to thy Lord turn in Prayer and Sacrifice.

For he who hateth thee, he will be cut off (from Future Hope).

Lo! We have given thee Abundance;

So pray unto thy Lord, and sacrifice.

Lo! it is thy insulter (and not thou) who is without posterity.

Commentary
The word Kauthar is derived from the root ك - ث - ر k - th - r, which has meanings of "to increase in number, to outnumber, to happen frequently; to show pride in wealth and/or children; to be rich, plentiful, abundance." The form Kawthar itself is an intensive deverbal noun, meaning "abundance, multitude". It appears in the Qur'an solely in this sūrah.

Hadith
The first and foremost exegesis/tafsir of the Qur'an is found in hadith of Muhammad. Although scholars including ibn Taymiyyah claim that Muhammad has commented on the whole of the Qur'an, others including Ghazali cite the limited amount of narratives, thus indicating that he has commented only on a portion of the Qur'an. Ḥadīth (حديث) is literally "speech" or "report", that is a recorded saying or tradition of Muhammad validated by isnad; with Sirah Rasul Allah these comprise the sunnah and reveal shariah. According to Aishah, the life of the Islamic prophet Muhammad was practical implementation of Qur'an. Therefore, higher count of hadith elevates the importance of the pertinent surah from a certain perspective. This surah was held in special esteem in hadith, which can be observed by these related narratives.

 Imam Ahmad recorded from Anas bin Malik that a man said, "O Messenger of Allah! What is Al-Kawthar?" He (the Prophet) replied: "It is a river in Paradise which my Lord has given me. It is whiter than milk and sweeter than honey. There are birds in it whose necks are (long) like carrots." Umar said, "O Messenger of Allah! Verily, they (the birds) will be beautiful." The Prophet replied: "The one who eats them (i.e., the people of Paradise) will be more beautiful than them, O Umar."
 Narrated by Anas bin Malik: The Prophet said: "While I was walking in Paradise (on the night of Mi'raj), I saw a river, on the two banks of which there were tents made of hollow pearls. I asked, "What is this, O Gabriel?" He said, '"that is the Kawthar which Your Lord has given to you." Behold! Its scent or its mud was sharp smelling musk!" (The sub-narrator, Hudba is in doubt as to the correct expression.)
 Narrated by Ibn 'Abbas: The word 'Al-Kauthar' means the abundant good which Allah gave to him (the Prophet Muhammad). Abu Bishr said: I said to Sa'id ibn Jubayr, "Some people claim that it (Al-Kauthar) is a river in Paradise." Sa`ibn Jubayr, replied, "The river that is in Paradise is one item of that good which Allah has bestowed upon him (Muhammad)."
 Narrated Abu ʿUbaidah : I asked 'Aisha 'regarding the verse:--'Verily we have granted you the Kauthar.' She replied, "The Kauthar is a river which has been given to your Prophet on the banks of which there are (tents of) hollow pearls and its utensils are as numberless as the stars."
 Narrated Haritha bin Wahb : I heard the Prophet mentioning the Lake-Fount (Al-Kauthar), saying, "(The width of the Lake-Fount) is equal to the distance between Medina and Sana' (capital of Yemen)." Haritha said that he heard the Prophet saying that his Lake-Fount would be as large as the distance between Sana' and Medina. Al-Mustaurid said to Haritha, "Didn't you hear him talking about the vessels?" He said, "No." Al-Mustaurid said, "The vessels are seen in it as (numberless as) the stars."
 Narrated Anas bin Malik : One day the Messenger of Allah (may peace be upon him) was sitting amongst us that he dozed off. He then raised his head smilingly. We said: What makes you smile. Messenger of Allah? He said: A Sura has just been revealed to me, and then recited: In the name of Allah, the Compassionate, the Merciful. Verily We have given thee Kauthar (fount of abundance). Therefore, turn to thy Lord for prayer and offer sacrifice, and surely thy enemy is cut off (from the good). Then he (the Prophet) said: Do you know what Kauthar is? We said: Allah and His Messenger know best. The Prophet (may peace be upon him) said: It (Kauthar) is a canal which my Lord, the Exalted and Glorious has promised me, and there is an abundance of good in it. It is a cistern and my people would come to it on the Day of Resurrection, and tumblers there would be equal to the number of stars. A servant would be turned away from (among the people gathered there). Upon this I would say: My Lord, he is one of my people, and He (the Lord) would say: You do not know that he innovated new things (in Islam) after you. Ibn Hujr made this addition in the hadith:" He (the Prophet) was sitting amongst us in the mosque, and He (Allah) said: (You don't know) what he innovated after you"
 Narrated Sahl ibn Sa'd : I heard the Prophet saying, "I am your predecessor at the Lake-Fount (Kauthar), and whoever will come to it, will drink from it, and whoever will drink from it, will never become thirsty after that. There will come to me some people whom I know and they know me, and then a barrier will be set up between me and them." Abu Sa'id Al-Khudri added that the Prophet further said: "I will say those people are from me. It will be said, 'You do not know what changes and new things they did after you.' Then I will say, 'Far removed (from mercy), far removed (from mercy), those who changed (the religion) after me! "
 Narrated Asma' : The Prophet said, "I will be at my Lake-Fount (Kauthar) waiting for whoever will come to me. Then some people will be taken away from me whereupon I will say, 'My followers!' It will be said, 'You do not know they turned Apostates as renegades (deserted their religion).'" (Ibn Abi Mulaika said, "Allah, we seek refuge with You from turning on our heels from the (Islamic) religion and from being put to trial").
 Narrated 'Abdullah : The Prophet said, "I am your predecessor at the Lake-Fount (Kauthar) and some men amongst you will be brought to me, and when I will try to hand them some water, they will be pulled away from me by force whereupon I will say, 'O Lord, my companions!' Then the Almighty will say, 'You do not know what they did after you left, they introduced new things into the religion after you.'"
 Narrated Samra ibn Jundab : I heard the Prophet, saying, "I am your predecessor at the Lake-Fount.(Al-Kauthar).
 Narrated Abu Huraira : The Prophet said, "There is a garden from the gardens of Paradise between my house and my pulpit, and my pulpit is on my Lake Fount (Al-Kauthar)."
 Narrated Anas bin Malik : Allah's Messenger sent for the Ansar and gathered them in a tent and said to them, "Be patient till you meet Allah and His Messenger, and I will be on the lake-Tank (Al-Kauthar)."
 Narrated Mukhtar bin Fulful : that he had heard Anas b. Malik said that the Messenger of Allah (may peace be upon him) dozed off, and the rest of the hadith is the same as transmitted by Mus−hir except for the words that he (the Prophet) said: It (Kauthar) is a canal which my Lord the Exalted and the Glorious has promised me in Paradise. There is a tank over it, but he made no mention of the tumblers like the number of the stars.
 Narrated Uqbah ibn Amir : One day the Prophet went out and offered the funeral prayers of the martyrs of Uhud and then went up the pulpit and said, "I will pave the way for you as your predecessor and will be a witness on you. By Allah! I see my Fount (Kauthar) just now and I have been given the keys of all the treasures of the earth (or the keys of the earth). By Allah! I am not afraid that you will worship others along with Allah after my death, but I am afraid that you will fight with one another for the worldly things."
 Narrated Yahya bin Said : Once the Prophet called the Ansar to grant them part of the land of Bahrain. On that, they said, "No! By Allah, we will not accept it unless you grant a similar thing to our Quarries brothers as well." He said, "That will be theirs if Allah wishes." But when the Ansar persisted in their request, he said, "After me, you will see others given preference over you in this respect (in which case) you should be patient till you meet me at the Tank (of Al-Kauthar)."
 Narrated Usaid bin Hudair : A man from the Ansar said, "O Allah's Messenger! Will you appoint me as you have appointed so-and-so?" The Prophet said, "After me, you will see others given preference to you; so be patient till you meet me at the Tank (i.e. Lake of Kauthar). (on the Day of Resurrection)."
 Narrated Anas bin Malik : The Prophet said to the Ansar, "After me, you will see others given preference to you; so be patient till you meet me, and your promised place (of the meeting) will be the Tank (i.e. Lake of Kauthar)."
 Narrated Anas bin Malik : When Allah favored His Messenger with the properties of Hawazin tribe as Fai (booty), he started giving to some Quarries men even up to one-hundred camels each, whereupon some Ansari men said about Allah's Messenger, "May Allah forgive His Messenger! He is giving to (men of) Qur'aish and leaves us, even though our swords are still dropping blood (of the infidels)" When Allah's Messenger was informed of what they had said, he called the Ansar and gathered them in a leather tent and did not call anybody else along, with them. When they gathered, Allah's Messenger came to them and said, "What is the statement which, I have been informed, and that which you have said?" The learned ones among them replied," O Allah's Messenger! The wise ones amongst us did not say anything, but the youngsters amongst us said, 'May Allah forgive His Messenger; he gives the Qur'aish and leaves the Ansar, even though our swords are still dribbling (wet) with the blood of the infidels.' " Allah's Messenger replied, I give to such people as are still close to the period of Infidelity (i.e. they have recently embraced Islam and Faith is still weak in their hearts). Won't you be pleased to see people go with fortune, while you return with Allah's Messenger to your houses? By Allah, what you will return with, is better than what they are returning with." The Ansar replied, "Yes, O Allah's Messenger, we are satisfied' Then the Prophet said to them." You will find after me, others being preferred to you. Then be patient till you meet Allah and meet His Messenger at Al-Kauthar (i.e. a fount in Paradise)." (Anas added:) But we did not remain patient.

References

External links
Quran 108  Clear Quran translation

Kawthar
Fatimah